Euploea climena is a butterfly in the family Nymphalidae. It was described by Caspar Stoll in 1782. It is found in the Indomalayan realm and the Australasian realm.

Subspecies
E. c. climena (Ambon)
E. c. melina (Godart, 1819) (Serang)
E. c. eurypon Hewitson, 1858 (Aru, Kai Island)
E. c. sepulchralis Butler, 1866 (West Java, Bawean)
E. c. simulatrix Wood-Mason & de Nicéville, 1881 (Nicobars)
E. c. macleari (Butler, 1887) (Christmas Island, Northwest Australia)
E. c. palmedo Doherty, 1891 (Sumba)
E. c. neptis Röber, 1891 (Flores)
E. c. elwesiana de Nicéville, 1897 (Bali, Lombok, Sumbawa)
E. c. dohertyi (Holland, 1900) (Buru)
E. c. bandana Fruhstorfer, 1904 (Banda Island)
E. c. valeriana Fruhstorfer, 1904 (Romang Island)
E. c. terissa Fruhstorfer, 1910 (East Java)
E. c. nobilis  Strand, 1914 (Admiralty Islands)

References

External links
Euploea at Markku Savela's Lepidoptera and Some Other Life Forms

Euploea
Butterflies described in 1782